Victor Fonfreide (1872-1934) was a French painter.

References

1872 births
1934 deaths
People from Puy-de-Dôme